The year 1690 in science and technology involved some significant events.

Astronomy
 Giovanni Cassini observes differential rotation within Jupiter's atmosphere.
 December – Earliest recorded sightings of the planet Uranus, by John Flamsteed, who mistakenly catalogues it as the star 34 Tauri.

Geography
 Vincenzo Coronelli gets published the first folio of the atlas Atlante Veneto.

Botany
 French horticulturalist Jean-Baptiste de La Quintinie's Instruction pour les jardins fruitiers et potagers is published posthumously.

Mathematics
  of Osaka publishes Sampo-Hakki (算法発揮), in which he gives the resultant and the Laplace expansion of the determinant for the n×n case. At about this date,  also describes and applies the resultant, in Sampo-Funkai (算法紛解).
 Michel Rolle publishes Traité d'Algebre, in which he gives the first published description in Europe of Gaussian elimination.

Medicine
 Justine Siegemund publishes Die Chur-Brandenburgische Hof-Wehemutter ("The Court Midwife"), the first medical textbook in German written by a woman.

Technology
 February 3 – America's first paper money is printed in the Massachusetts Bay Colony.
 A rudimentary working model of a History of the compass#Liquid compass is introduced by Sir Edmond Halley at a meeting of the Royal Society.
 French physicist Denis Papin, while in Leipzig and having observed the mechanical power of atmospheric pressure on his 'digester', builds a working model of a reciprocating steam engine for pumping water, the first of its kind, though not efficient.

Births
 March 18 – Christian Goldbach, Prussian mathematician (died 1764)

Deaths
 February 3 – Elizabeth Walker, English pharmacist (born 1623)
 October 13 – Ole Borch, Danish polymath (born 1626)
 October 22 (bur.) – William Ball, English astronomer (born c. 1631)

 
17th century in science
1690s in science